Kanak Lata Singh (born Monday, 1 January 1962 in Village Jainagar, District Deoria (Uttar Pradesh)) is a politician from Samajwadi Party is a Member of the Parliament of India representing Uttar Pradesh in the Rajya Sabha, the upper house of the Indian Parliament.

She has studied M.A. (Ancient History) Lucknow University. She is daughter of Samajwadi Party Leader Late Mohan Singh.

References

1962 births
Living people
Samajwadi Party politicians
Rajya Sabha members from Uttar Pradesh
People from Deoria, Uttar Pradesh
Women in Uttar Pradesh politics
21st-century Indian women politicians
21st-century Indian politicians
Women members of the Rajya Sabha
University of Lucknow alumni
Samajwadi Party politicians from Uttar Pradesh